André Simond (born 12 April 1935) is a French former alpine skier. He competed in the men's downhill at the 1956 Winter Olympics.

References

1935 births
Living people
French male alpine skiers
Olympic alpine skiers of France
Alpine skiers at the 1956 Winter Olympics
People from Chamonix
Sportspeople from Haute-Savoie